The Euroleague Challenge 2007, also called CBA-Euroleague Challenge is the basketball tournament for clubs, progressing in China.The teams:  Sydney Kings,  CSKA Moscow,  Benetton Treviso and  are competing from September 30 until October 2.

Results

Final standing 

1. CSKA Moscow
2.
3. Sydney Kings
4. Benetton Treviso

External links
CBA-Euroleague Challenge 2007

Challenge
2007–08 in Chinese basketball
2007–08 in Russian basketball
2007–08 in Australian basketball
2007–08 in Italian basketball
International basketball competitions hosted by China